North Prescott Street is a light rail station on the MAX Yellow Line in Portland, Oregon. It is the 4th stop northbound on the Interstate MAX extension.

The station is located in the median of Interstate Avenue near the intersection of N Going Street. The station is a center platform, with its main artistic theme drawing upon the nearby shipping industry at Swan Island and the environment.

External links
Station information (with northbound ID number) from TriMet
Station information (with southbound ID number) from TriMet
MAX Light Rail Stations – more general TriMet page

MAX Light Rail stations
MAX Yellow Line
Railway stations in the United States opened in 2004
2004 establishments in Oregon
Overlook, Portland, Oregon
Railway stations in Portland, Oregon